Stefan Bidstrup (born 24 February 1975) is a retired Danish footballer who played as a midfielder.

Playing career
Bidstrup started his career with Helsingør IF before moving to Lyngby BK in 1997. Despite scoring an own goal in his Danish Superliga debut against Brøndby, Bidstrup quickly established himself as a key player in the side, and soon attracted interest from foreign clubs.

In November 2000, he joined Wigan Athletic for a fee of £450,000. He made his debut on 11 November in a 2–1 win against Cambridge United, and scored his first goal a week later in the FA Cup in a 3–1 win against Dorchester Town. Due to constant injury problems, Bidstrup made just 15 league appearances for Wigan before being released in the summer of 2001.

He then signed for Aalborg BK, and spent the rest of his career in Denmark before retiring in 2006.

References

External links
Danish league stats

1975 births
Living people
Danish men's footballers
Association football midfielders
Lyngby Boldklub players
Danish Superliga players
Wigan Athletic F.C. players
Danish expatriate men's footballers
Expatriate footballers in England
English Football League players
AaB Fodbold players
Viborg FF players